California's 4th State Senate district is one of 40 California State Senate districts. It is currently represented by Democrat Marie Alvarado-Gil of Jackson.

District profile 
The district encompasses much of the Sacramento Valley, reaching almost to the Sacramento–San Joaquin River Delta. The district mainly comprises rural farmland, but a substantial minority of the population is clustered in the Sacramento metropolitan area in the southern tip of the district.

All of Butte County
 Biggs
 Chico
 Gridley
 Oroville
 Paradise

All of Colusa County
 Colusa
 Williams

All of Glenn County
 Orland
 Willows

Placer County – 37.1%
 Roseville – ~100.0%
 Sheridan

Sacramento County – 21.8%
 Antelope
 Carmichael
 Citrus Heights
 Elverta
 Foothill Farms
 North Highlands – partial
 Rancho Cordova – 69.5%
 Rio Linda

All of Sutter County
 Live Oak
 Yuba City

All of Tehama County
 Corning
 Red Bluff
 Tehama

All of Yuba County
 Marysville
 Wheatland

Election results from statewide races

List of State Senators 
Due to redistricting, the 4th district has been moved around different parts of the state. The current iteration resulted from the 2011 redistricting by the California Citizens Redistricting Commission.

Election results

2018

2014

2013 (special)

2010

2006

2002

1998

1994

See also 
California State Senate
California State Senate districts
Districts in California

References

External links 
 District map from the California Citizens Redistricting Commission

04
Sacramento Valley
Government of Butte County, California
Government of Colusa County, California
Government of Glenn County, California
Government of Placer County, California
Government of Sacramento County, California
Government of Sutter County, California
Government of Tehama County, California
Government of Yuba County, California
Carmichael, California
Chico, California
Citrus Heights, California
Colusa, California
Gridley, California
Marysville, California
Oroville, California
Paradise, California
Rancho Cordova, California
Red Bluff, California
Roseville, California
Yuba City, California
Willows, California